The State-owned Enterprises Commission (SEC) is the government agency of the Ministry of Economic Affairs of the Taiwan (ROC) in charge of supervising the management and operation of state-owned enterprises.

History
SEC was originally established as National Corporations Department in 1952. In 1965, it was restructured to the Commission for the Commercialization of National Corporations. In 1969, it was reorganized to become the Commission of National Corporations. In 2003, it was renamed the State-owned Enterprise Commission.

Organizational structures
 First Division
 Second Division
 Third Division
 Fourth Division
 Personnel Office
 Accounting Office
 Government Ethics Office

Transportation
The headquarter office is accessible within walking distance south of Ximen Station of Taipei Metro.

See also
 Economy of Taiwan
 State-owned Assets Supervision and Administration Commission, the equivalent in Mainland China (PRC).

References

External links
 

1952 establishments in Taiwan
Executive Yuan
Government agencies established in 1952
Government of Taiwan